Small white may refer to
Dixeia, a genus of butterflies commonly known as the small whites
Pieris rapae, a butterfly commonly known as the cabbage, cabbage white, or small white
Small White pig, an extinct breed of domestic pig

Animal common name disambiguation pages